Miracle in the Land of Oblivion is a 1991 Ukrainian film directed by Natalia Motuzko. It is based on the story of Valery Shevchuk "Petro Utekliy".

Plot 
Miracle in the Land of Oblivion is the story of the murder of two twin brothers, whom the villagers consider to be one person. Out of fear that the Messiah will come and do a terrible judgment, people commit new crimes.

Cast 

 Valentin Trotsyuk — Deacon
 Anatoly Hostikoev — Chancellor
 Rayisa Nedashkivska — Vyutska
 Konstantin Stepankov — Centurion
Oleg Savkin — Find
Klimene Nele — Lydia Levaida
Alexander Movchan — Simon Levaida
Taras Denisenko — Ivan Dyachenko
Lev Perfilov — Starosta
Stanislav Lisny — Khoma Bida

External links 

Miracle in the Land of Oblivion on YouTube

References

Ukrainian drama films
1991 films